Ian Andrew Goldin is a South African-born British professor at the University of Oxford in England, and was the founding director of the Oxford Martin School at the University of Oxford. He is Professor of Globalisation and Development, holds a professorial fellowship at Balliol College, Oxford, is director of the Oxford Martin Research Programmes on Technological and Economic Change, Future of Work and Future of Development.

Education
Goldin attended Pretoria Boys High School and Rondebosch Boys' High School, Cape Town. He subsequently obtained a Bachelor of Arts (Hons) and a Bachelor of Science from the University of Cape Town, a Master of Science from the London School of Economics, and a Master of Arts and Doctor of Philosophy from the University of Oxford. He has completed INSEAD's Advanced Management Programme.

Career
Prior to 1996 Goldin was principal economist at the European Bank for Reconstruction and Development (EBRD) in London, and program director at the OECD in Paris, where he directed the Development Centre's Programs on Trade, Environment and Sustainable Development.

From 1996 to 2001, Goldin was chief executive and managing director of the Development Bank of Southern Africa (DBSA) and at that time also served as an adviser to President Nelson Mandela. He succeeded in transforming the Bank from an apartheid-era institution to become the leading agent of development in the 14 countries of Southern Africa. During this period, Goldin served on several government committees and boards, and was finance director for South Africa's Olympic Games bid.

Goldin was director of development policy at the World Bank (2001–2003) and then vice president of the World Bank (2003–2006). He served on the Bank's senior management team, and was directly responsible for its relationship with the UK and all other European, North American and developed countries. Goldin led the Bank's collaboration with the United Nations and other partners. As Director of Development Policy, Goldin played a central role in the research and strategy agenda of the Bank, working closely with the Chief Economist, Lord Nicholas Stern, under the leadership of James Wolfensohn. During this period, Goldin was special representative at the United Nations and served on the chief executive board of the UN and the UN Reform Task Force.

In 2006, Goldin became founding director of the Oxford Martin School. Under his leadership, the school established 45 programmes of research, bringing together more than 500 academics from over 100 disciplines, and becoming the world's leading centre for interdisciplinary research into critical global challenges. He remained the School's director until September 2016 when Achim Steiner followed him in this position.

Goldin initiated and was vice-chair of the Oxford Martin Commission for Future Generations, which brought together international leaders from government, business, academia, media and civil society to address the growing short-term preoccupations of modern politics and business, and identify ways of overcoming today's gridlock in key international negotiations. Chaired by Pascal Lamy, the Commission published its findings in October 2013.

Other activities
In addition to his Oxford appointments, Goldin has been a distinguished visiting professor at Sciences Po, Paris and served on the Advisory Committee of ETH-Zurich and IDDRI (The Institute for Sustainable Development and International Relations), Paris.  He is an honorary trustee of Comic Relief and is chair of the trustees of the Core-Econ initiative to reform the economics curriculum and the teaching of economics. He is the writer and presenter of the BBC series 'After the Crash', 'The Pandemic that Changed the World', and documentary: 'Will AI Kill Development?' He has been interviewed and presented on all major global news media, including BBCHardTalk.

Goldin has been engaged with governments and with other policy actors on development in Asia (notably, in China, India, Indonesia, Philippines, Thailand, Vietnam), Africa (worked in over 25 countries in Africa, including in Maghreb, Francophone Africa, and Southern and Eastern Africa), Eastern Europe (Hungary, Czech Republic, Romania, Poland), Latin America (notably, Mexico, Central America, Argentina, Chile and Brazil), the European Union, US, and Japan.

As a visiting lecturer, he has given lectures, workshops and seminars at the Universities of Oxford, Harvard, MIT, Columbia (New York), UC Berkeley, LSE, Sussex, Sorbonne (Paris 1), SciencesPo., Toulouse, Amsterdam, Stockholm, Tokyo, Cape Town, Witwatersrand, Dar es Salaam, Accra, Beijing, Tsinghua, Shanghai, Singapore, Thailand (TDRI), Rome, Rio de Janeiro, Santa Fe, São Paulo, Buenos Aires, Managua, Mexico DF, and to numerous foundations, think tanks and others.

He has initiated and directed a wide range of collaborative research programs including OECD/CEPR/Rockefeller Programs on “The Economics of Sustainable Development” and “Economic Reform, Trade and Development”.

He is an acclaimed author and has published 23 books and over 60 journal articles.

Awards
Goldin has received wide recognition for his contributions to development and research.
His awards include:

 France: “Chevalier de l’Ordre national du Mérite”. (Awarded for Services to Development, 2000).
 National Productivity Institute: Gold Award. (Awarded for Management, 1999).
 World Economic Forum: Global Leader for Tomorrow. (Achievements in Development, 1998).

Publications
Goldin has published 22 books and over 60 articles, including:

 "Age of the City: Why Our Future will be Won or Lost Together", Bloomsbury, June 2023 (forthcoming)
 "Why is productivity slowing down?", Journal of Economic Literature (forthcoming)
 "Rescue: From Global Crisis to a Better World", Hodder Hachette, 2021
"Terra Incognita: 100 Maps to Survive the Next 100 Years", with Robert Muggah, Penguin, 2020
 "The Productivity Paradox: Reconciling Rapid Technological Change and Stagnating Productivity" Oxford Martin Programme on Technological and Economic Change, 2019
"Migration and the Economy: Economic Realities, Social Impacts and Political Choices", Citi GPS: Global Perspectives and Solutions, 2018
"Development: A Very Short Introduction", Oxford University Press, 2018
"Age of Discovery: Navigating the Storms of Our New Renaissance", with Dr Chris Kutarna, Bloomsbury, 2017
 "The Pursuit of Development: Economic Growth, Social Change and Ideas", OUP, 2016
 "The Butterfly Defect: How globalization creates systemic risk and what to do about it", Princeton University Press, 2014
 "Is the Planet Full?", Oxford University Press, 2014
 "Divided Nations: Why global governance is failing and what we can do about it", Oxford University Press, 2013.
 "Globalization for Development: Meeting New Challenges”, (with Kenneth Reinert), Oxford University Press, 2012
 "Exceptional People: How Migration Shaped Our World and Will Define Our Future", (with Geoffrey Cameron and Meera Balarajan), Princeton University Press, 2011.
 “Globalization for Development: Trade, Finance, Aid, Migration, and Policy”, (with Kenneth Reinert), World Bank and Palgrave Macmillan, Washington and Basingstoke, 2006, reprinted in 2007.
 “The Case For Aid”, (with Nicholas Stern and F. Halsey Rogers), World Bank, Washington, 2002
 “The Economics of Sustainable Development” (edited with Alan Winters), Cambridge University Press, Cambridge, 1995.
 Global Governance and Systemic Risk in the 21st Century (with Tiffany Vogel), Global Policy, 1(1), January 2010.
 Globalisation and Risks for Business, 360 Risk Insight Report, Lloyds, London, 2010.

References

External links
 
 Professor Ian Goldin Biography from Oxford Martin School
 

1955 births
Living people
Alumni of the London School of Economics
Alumni of the University of Oxford
White South African anti-apartheid activists
Fellows of Balliol College, Oxford
INSEAD alumni
20th-century South African economists
South African bankers
South African emigrants to the United Kingdom
University of Cape Town alumni
Alumni of Rondebosch Boys' High School
Institute for New Economic Thinking
Alumni of St Antony's College, Oxford
21st-century British economists